North Sichuan Medical University, previously North Sichuan Medical College (NSMC), is a provincial medical school with campuses in Shunqing District and Gaoping District, Nanchong city, Sichuan Province, China.

North Sichuan Medical University is a government-run college of medicine in Sichuan Province and is in the second largest higher education center of Sichuan Province — Nanchong, a famous city, the origin of the Three Kingdoms Culture. Its two campuses occupy an area of over 823,693 square meters.

NSMC has its national and international enrollment; its campuses enroll nearly 10,000 students in undergraduate and postgraduate programs.

History

Founded in 1951 as North Sichuan School of Medicine (southwest region of China), the school was renamed North Sichuan Medical College in 1985.

Academic departments and schools
School of Basic Medicine
School of Clinical Medicine (the Affiliated Hospital of North Sichuan Medical College)
School of Pharmacy
School of Social Science
School of Nursing
School of Continuing Education
School of Foreign Language and Culture
Faculty of Medical Imaging
Faculty of Anesthesiology
Faculty of Stomatology
Faculty of Forensic Medicine
Faculty of Combined Chinese and Western Medicine
Faculty of Optometry and Ophthalmology

Campus
  
North Sichuan Medical has two campuses. The west campus, also known as the old campus, is in downtown Nanchong City. The east campus, or the new campus, is in Gaoping District of Nanchong City.

Affiliated hospitals
The Affiliated Hospital of North Sichuan Medical College is one of the best hospitals in northeast Sichuan. It is the only hospital under direct jurisdiction of North Sichuan Medical College. It has an affiliated  Nursing School, which is a technical secondary school.

Nanchong Central Hospital became the Affiliated Nanchong Central Hospital of North Sichuan Medical College and the Second Clinical College of North Sichuan Medical College in 2005.

Other affiliated hospitals include the following:
The Affiliated Bazhong Hospital of North Sichuan Medical College
The Affiliated Suining Hospital of North Sichuan Medical College
The Affiliated Mianyang 404 Hospital of North Sichuan Medical College
The Affiliated Guang'an Hospital of North Sichuan Medical College

Renowned professors
Prof. Lin Baodong (Pharmacology, also the chairman of North Sichuan Medical College)
Prof. Kang Jian (Human Anatomy, also the President of North Sichuan Medical College)
Prof. Yan Jiacheng (Biochemistry)
Prof. Li Jian (Preventive Medicine)
Prof. Zhou Jingguo (Hematology, also the president of the Affiliated Hospital of North Sichuan Medical College)
Prof. Yuan Guohua (Rheumatology and Immunology)
Prof. Du Yong (Medical Imaging)
Prof. Li Chengjun (Human Anatomy)
Prof. Huang Anpei (Histology and Embryology)
Prof. Xie Xianyong (Pathology)
Prof. Wen Bing (Pathology)
Prof. Chen Huaxu (Biochemistry)
Prof. Cheng Zhongda (Urology)<
Prof. Zhang Xiaoming (Medical Imaging)
Prof. Chen Kai (General Surgery)
Prof. Lv Benru (Physiology)
Prof. Huang Jiulin (Traditional Chinese Medicine)
Prof. Lan Changjun (Ophthalmology)
Prof. Long Cunguo (Neurology)
Prof. Chen Shaoping (Respirology)
Prof. Feng Zhisong (Gastroenterology)
Prof. Yan Zongxun (Endocrinology and Metabolism)
Prof. Pi Guanghuan (Pediatrics)
Prof. Wei Yushu (Pediatrics)
Prof. Sui Weichi (Dermatology)
Prof. Wang Chongshu (General Surgery)
Prof. Liu Longyue (ENT)
Prof. Zeng Yue (Loimology)
Prof. Wei Jin (Hematology)
Prof. Cao Liting. (Ultrasound Medicine)
Prof. Xiao Finagling (Library science; also the chief librarian of North Sichuan Medical College）

Scientific research

Scholarships
Canadian Fuhui Charity Foundation Scholarship
Hong Kong Fuhui Charity Foundation Scholarship
Guangzhou Study Grant
State Study Grant of China
Overseas Alumni Study Grant

Faculty
NSMC has over 400 members of the faculty holding Master’s or Doctorate degrees. More than 300 have obtained the academic title of professor and associate professor. In addition, there are over 50 returned scholars and experts. Over 20 of them enjoy special government subsidies or have been given positions of national leadership in their field.

Facilities
There are three national scientific research labs, three provincial key subjects, one key lab, one course, and 13 key courses on the provincial level.

Its library has over 930,000 books and has subscribed to more than 1,567 Chinese, English and foreign periodicals in addition to over 17,000 electronic periodicals both in Chinese and foreign languages.

North Sichuan Medical College is famous for its Faculty of Medical Imaging, which is one of the first five medical imaging faculties in China. In 2005, North Sichuan Medical College began to enroll its first postgraduate students.

Achievements
In recent years, the college has undertaken 8 national research projects, five projects from the Ministry of Education, Ministry of Public Health and State Chinese Medicine Administration, and 238 provincial key and scientific research projects. It has published 3,500 scientific research papers, 65 treatises, among which 54 papers have been embodied by SCI and ET.

The rate of employment among graduates remains above 95%, the highest among colleges in Sichuan Province.

See also
List of universities and colleges in Sichuan

References

Universities and colleges in Sichuan
Medical schools in China
Buildings and structures in Nanchong